Miroslav Vidac (4 September 1949 – 24 April 2011) was a Romanian footballer who played as a goalkeeper.

Honours
Bihor Oradea
Divizia B: 1974–75

References

External links
Miroslav Vidac at Labtof.ro

1949 births
2011 deaths
Romanian footballers
Association football goalkeepers
Liga I players
Liga II players
FC Politehnica Timișoara players
FC UTA Arad players
FC Bihor Oradea players
People from Timiș County